The communauté de communes du Canton de Valmont  was located in the Seine-Maritime département of the Normandy  region of northern France. It was created in January 2000. It was merged into the Communauté d'agglomération de Fécamp Caux Littoral in January 2017.

Participants 
The Communauté de communes comprised the following communes:

Ancretteville-sur-Mer
Angerville-la-Martel
Colleville
Contremoulins
Criquetot-le-Mauconduit
Écretteville-sur-Mer
Életot
Gerponville
Limpiville
Riville
Sainte-Hélène-Bondeville
Saint-Pierre-en-Port
Sassetot-le-Mauconduit
Sorquainville
Thérouldeville
Theuville-aux-Maillots
Thiergeville
Thiétreville
Toussaint
Valmont
Vinnemerville
Ypreville-Biville

See also
Communes of the Seine-Maritime department

References 

Canton de Valmont